Pandemic Studios, LLC was an American video game developer based in Westwood, Los Angeles. Andrew Goldman and Josh Resnick founded the studio in 1998 after leaving Activision. Pandemic Studios, alongside BioWare, was acquired in 2005 by Elevation Partners and placed under VG Holding Corp., which in 2007 was sold to Electronic Arts (EA). EA closed Pandemic Studios in 2009. Pandemic Studios is known for a variety of titles, including Full Spectrum Warrior, Star Wars: Battlefront, Dark Reign 2, Destroy All Humans!, Mercenaries, and The Saboteur.

History
Pandemic was formed in 1998 by president Josh Resnick and CEO Andrew Goldman, both formerly of Activision, along with most of the original team members that worked on Battlezone and Dark Reign: The Future of War. The studio was founded with an equity investment by Activision. The company name was narrowed down from around six choices, including Seismic. In the end, Pandemic was chosen as the name. Pandemic's first two games, Battlezone II and Dark Reign 2, were both sequels to the aforementioned games for Activision.

In 2000, Pandemic opened a development studio in Brisbane, Australia, within the suburb of Fortitude Valley, whose first project was Army Men: RTS, a real-time strategy console game using the Dark Reign 2 engine. Destroy All Humans! was the studio's next game. In 2003, the Los Angeles studio moved from its founding location at Santa Monica to a high-rise building in Westwood.

In November 2005, a partnership was announced between Pandemic and Canada's BioWare, with private equity fund Elevation Partners investing in the partnership. Both companies retained their brands and identities. On October 11, 2007, it was announced that VG Holding Corp., BioWare and Pandemic's owner, would be acquired by Electronic Arts as of January 2008, subject to FTC approval.

In February 2009, the Brisbane office was shut down. Nine months later, in November, EA cut a total of 1,500 jobs, which affected various studios, including Pandemic. On November 17, EA officially confirmed Pandemic's closure, laying off 228 employees. The company absorbed 35 Pandemic employees into its EA Los Angeles studio to support The Saboteur and an unannounced project which was later revealed to be Mercs Inc, a sequel to the Mercenaries series. In response, four former employees of the studio created an Office Space-style video, where they are shown smashing their office printer.

Over a dozen former Pandemic developers are now employed at 343 Industries having worked on Halo: Combat Evolved Anniversary and Halo 4. Other former employees have gone to work for Infinity Ward, Treyarch, Respawn Entertainment (who EA would later acquire in 2017), Blendo Games and many others.

Games developed

Cancelled
 Batman: The Dark Knight
 Mercenaries 3: No Limits
 The Next Big Thing/No Limits Racing

References

External links
Official site

Electronic Arts
Defunct video game companies of the United States
Video game companies established in 1998
Video game companies disestablished in 2009
2007 mergers and acquisitions
Video game development companies
Defunct companies based in Greater Los Angeles
1998 establishments in California
2009 disestablishments in California